J. E. Lucas was a college football player.

University of Georgia
He was a prominent center for the Georgia Bulldogs football team of the University of Georgia.

1909
In 1909, his defense drew praise in the losses to Alabama and Georgia Tech. Lucas was selected All-Southern.

References

All-Southern college football players
Georgia Bulldogs football players
American football centers